Everybody's may refer to:
 Everybody's (Australian magazine), an Australian tabloid-style magazine of the 1960s
 Everybody's Magazine, an American magazine published from 1899 to 1929
 Everybody's Weekly, a British weekly tabloid also called Everybody's